Jean Adrien Bigonnet (1755–1832) was a French revolutionist and republican who became a member of the Council of Five Hundred (1795–1799).

Bigonnet was a Representative during the Hundred Days and played a notable part in the abdication of Napoleon in 1815, by pointing out in the legislator during the debate on Napoleon's abdication that the Coalition were in arms to secure the Treaty of Paris (1814). The Treaty of Paris (1814) said that Napoleon and his family were excluded from the throne of France, so persuading the legislator that if  Napoleon's young son (Napoleon II) was to be head of state on the abdication of Napoleon then the Coalition would continue the war.

Works

Notes

References
 

1755 births
1832 deaths
People from Mâcon
Politicians from Bourgogne-Franche-Comté
French republicans
Members of the Council of Five Hundred
Members of the Chamber of Representatives (France)
French revolutionaries